Stockbridge is a city in Henry County, Georgia, United States. As of the 2010 census, the population was 25,637, up from 9,853 in 2000.

Stockbridge is part of the Atlanta metropolitan area.

History
The area was settled in 1829 when Concord Methodist Church was organized near present-day Old Stagecoach Road. It was granted a post office on April 5, 1847, named for a traveling professor, Levi Stockbridge, who passed through the area many times before the post office was built. He was said to be well known and respected in his namesake community. Others contend that the city was named after Thomas Stocks, who was State Surveyor and president of the Georgia State Senate in the 1820s.

In 1881, the East Tennessee, Virginia and Georgia Railroad was to pass through Stockbridge between Macon and Atlanta. The settlers who owned the land about Old Stockbridge asked such a high price for their land that two prominent Atlanta citizens, John W. Grant and George W. Adair, bought a tract about a mile south of Old Stockbridge and offered lots at a reasonable price. Here the railroad built their depot and many lots were sold.

Stockbridge was incorporated as a town in 1895 and as a city on August 6, 1920, turning 100 years old on August 6, 2020.

The Aaron and Margaret Parker Jr. House and Walden-Turner House in Stockbridge are listed on the National Register of Historic Places.

Naming mystery
On May 6, 1992, Mayor Segio received a letter from John Stockbridge of South Carolina requesting a letter of "Greeting" from the City of Stockbridge to the attendees of the first reunion of the Stockbridge family. In his letter, he mentioned that he grew up in Georgia and had been told as a child that the city of Stockbridge was named after his great-great-grandfather Levi Stockbridge, who had traveled back and forth from the North to his property in Florida and stopped here on his journey.

Levi Stockbridge was born on March 13, 1820, and fits the time frame just prior to the Civil War. Levi would have been 27 years of age when Stockbridge was assigned a post office in 1847.

Until May 6, 1992, there had never been a name other than Professor Stockbridge. At that time, Levi Stockbridge was mentioned as the person for whom the city may have been named.

It is not certain that Levi Stockbridge was the individual for whom the citizens of the community named their post office and village. However, through John Stockbridge's letters and many conversations with him, it is believed that this is the rightful Professor Stockbridge who had been unknown for 146 years.

Recent history

Eminent domain controversy
The city reportedly wanted to build a new city hall, park/square, and a small tract of land for new and more desirable business to incorporate a new image for the city. Stockbridge became the focus of national news and was also one of the largest issues in the 2006 Georgia General Assembly and their efforts to prevent abuse of eminent domain.

Many of the citizens of Stockbridge and Henry County were surprised by the apparent abuse of eminent domain by the city. Early in 2006, a protest was organized by the NAACP and supported by the Republican and Libertarian parties from the county. Syndicated Atlanta talk show host Neal Boortz said during his show, "Private property rights are dead in Stockbridge, Georgia," and called members of the Stockbridge City Council "sorry bastards".

The Henry County Board of Commissioners took a stance on the issue by unanimously approving a non-binding resolution that the county would not take land for economic development purposes. However, the county legally has no say in what the City of Stockbridge can do with its land and its use of eminent domain. Many have said this was just a political strategy, as Henry County has been shown in recent voting history to be one of the most conservative counties in the Atlanta metro area, consistently voting Republican in early 21st century presidential elections. (However, as the population grew, the county voted Democratic in the 2016 and 2020 elections.)

The conflict between the city and the property owners came to an end on February 2, 2007, as the Georgia Court of Appeals threw out the condemnation. Only one store, a local florist, beat the eminent domain and was allowed to keep its store and property. A brick fence was erected around the florist shop to separate it from the new City Hall.

New city hall

After February 2007, the city had plans drawn up to build the new city hall. The plans called for the new city hall, park, and green space to be built around the florist's shop that started the now famous eminent domain lawsuit.

The city said that the new development would strengthen the old and worn-down downtown business district. Stockbridge City Manager Ted Strickland said that the new city hall was absolutely necessary, because some current city employees were working out of closets and supply rooms.

Secession movement
A group of residents in Stockbridge attempted to secede to form their own community called Eagle's Landing in the 2018 general election. The referendum was defeated.

Geography
Stockbridge is located in northwestern Henry County at  (33.534068, -84.231185). Its northwestern border follows the Clayton County line. Some unincorporated areas in Rockdale County have a Stockbridge mailing address, without actually being a part of the City of Stockbridge.

U.S. Route 23 is the main road through the center of the city, leading northwest  to downtown Atlanta and southeast  to McDonough, the Henry County seat. Interstate 75 passes through the southwest side of the city, with access from Exits 222, 224, and 228. I-75 leads northwest to Atlanta and southeast  to Macon. Interstate 675 splits from I-75 in northwestern Stockbridge and provides access to the city from its Exit 1.

Demographics

2000 census
At the 2000 census there were 9,853 people in 3,749 households, including 2,654 families, in the city. The racial makeup of the city was 71.63% White, 20.51% African American, 0.27% Native American, 4.55% Asian, 0.13% Pacific Islander, 1.44% from other races, and 1.46% from two or more races. Hispanic or Latino people of any race were 4.21%.

Of the 3,749 households 39.7% had children under the age of 18 living with them, 51.7% were married couples living together, 14.4% had a female householder with no husband present, and 29.2% were non-families. 22.3% of households were one person and 4.5% were one person aged 65 or older.  The average household size was 2.61 and the average family size was 3.06.

The age distribution was 28.3% under the age of 18, 8.8% from 18 to 24, 38.1% from 25 to 44, 18.1% from 45 to 64, and 6.7% 65 or older.  The median age was 31 years. For every 100 females, there were 91.4 males.  For every 100 females age 18 and over, there were 85.2 males.

The median household income was $48,296 and the median family income  was $51,341. Males had a median income of $38,457 versus $28,938 for females. The per capita income for the city was $21,380.  6.8% of the population and 6.0% of families were below the poverty line.   5.9% of those under the age of 18 and 17.1% of
those 65 and older were living below the poverty line.

2010 census
At the 2010 census, there were 25,636 people, 9,499 households, and 6,536 families in the city. The racial makeup of the city was 28.8% white, 55.7% black or African American, 7.6% Asian, 0.3% American Indian, 0.1% Pacific islander, 3.8% from other races, and 3.7% from two or more races. Those of Hispanic or Latino origin made up 9.5% of the population.

Of the 9,499 households, 41.2% had children under the age of 18 living with them, 41.6% were married couples living together, 22.0% had a female householder with no husband present, 31.2% were non-families, and 26.6% of households were made up of individuals. The average household size was 2.70 and the average family size was 3.29. The median age was 33.8 years.

2020 census

As of the 2020 United States census, there were 28,973 people, 10,244 households, and 7,549 families residing in the city.

Government
The Stockbridge city council has five councilmembers, holding council meetings on the second Monday of each month. As of February 2020, the current mayor of Stockbridge is Anthony S. Ford, whose term expires on December 31, 2021.

Parks and recreation
 Clark Community Park
 Gardner Park
 Memorial Park
 Monument Park at Eagle's Landing
 Reeves Creek Trail
 Eagles Landing Country Club
 Bridgefest – held annually on the last weekend in September
 Holiday Gala – held annually
 Sounds of Summer concert series – held annually on City Hall lawn
 Screen on the Green held annually – hosted by Stockbridge Main Street

Education

Public schools
Stockbridge is served by the Henry County School District.  Schools serving the Stockbridge area include:
 Cotton Indian Elementary School
 Dutchtown High, Middle and Elementary
 Eagles Landing Middle & High
 Flippen Elementary
 Pate's Creek Elementary School
 Pleasant Grove Elementary School
 Red Oak Elementary School
 Smith Barnes Elementary School
 Stockbridge Elementary School
 Stockbridge High School
 Stockbridge Middle School
 Woodland Elementary School
 Woodland High School
 Woodland Middle School

Private schools
 Community Christian School
 Mount Vernon Christian Academy
 Sunbrook Academy at Stockbridge

Infrastructure

Transportation
 Xpress GA provides local bus service.
 Berry Hill Airport  is a private airport located east of town and has no scheduled air service.

Stockbridge is served by the following highways:
  Interstate 75
  Interstate 675
  U.S. Highway 23
  Georgia State Route 42
  Georgia State Route 138
  Georgia State Route 401
  Georgia State Route 413

Notable people
 Mark Orrin Barton, perpetrator of the 1999 Atlanta day trading firm shootings
 Joey Clanton, race car driver
 Kyle Davies, professional baseball player
 Michael Harris II, professional baseball player
 Max Gresham, stock car racing driver
 Mark Hall, lead singer of contemporary Christian band Casting Crowns
 Bruce Irvin, NFL player, Seattle Seahawks
 Martin Luther King Sr., Baptist pastor, missionary, and early leader in the American Civil Rights Movement; father of Martin Luther King Jr.
 Phil McCullough, professional baseball player
 Lee H. Phillips, awarded the Medal of Honor for his actions during the Korean War
 Dean Roland, Ed Roland, and Will Turpin of the alternative rock band Collective Soul
 Ricky Sanders, race car driver
 Ken Sagoes, Actor, writer
Joycelyn Savage(R. Kelly's girlfriend)
 Jeffrey Dewberry, baker, appeared on Hells' Kitchen Season 1
 Kendrick Borst, Award-winning scholar

Media
 The Netflix television show Stranger Things was partially filmed in Stockbridge. Now-closed Patrick Henry High School was used for the middle and high school scenes. Smokin' Cues was also a filming location for the show.
 A scene in Furious 7, the seventh film of the Fast and Furious franchise, was filmed at the Vulcan Materials Company's rock quarry.
 Patrick Henry High School was used to film the middle school scenes of the horror film Brightburn.
 A scene from We Are Marshall was filmed at the W.D. Miller Store in Stockbridge.

References

External links
 City of Stockbridge official website 

 
Cities in Georgia (U.S. state)
Cities in Henry County, Georgia